Lowell L. Junkins (born March 9, 1944) is an American politician in the state of Iowa.

Junkins was born in Fort Madison, Iowa and attended Iowa State University. He served in the Iowa Senate from 1973 to 1987, as a Democrat. He unsuccessfully ran for Governor in 1986, losing to Terry Branstad.

References

1944 births
Living people
People from Fort Madison, Iowa
Iowa State University alumni
Businesspeople from Iowa
Democratic Party Iowa state senators